The 37th edition of the  World Allround Speed Skating Championships 1976 took place on 21 and 22 February in Gjøvik, Norway at the Gjøvik Stadion ice rink.

Title holder was the East German Karin Kessow.

Distance medalists

Classification

 * = Fell

Source:

References

1970s in speed skating
1970s in women's speed skating
1976 World Allround

Attribution
In Dutch